Samad Rakchan is a village in the Leh district of the Indian union territory of Ladakh. It is located in the Nyoma tehsil.

Demographics
According to the 2011 census of India, Samad Rakchan has 71 households. The effective literacy rate (i.e. the literacy rate of population excluding children aged 6 and below) is 54.91%.

References

Villages in Nyoma tehsil